Hans-Joachim "Achim" Kadelbach (born 11 May 1939) is a German sailor. He competed in the Flying Dutchman event at the 1960 Summer Olympics.

References

External links
 
 

1939 births
Living people
German male sailors (sport)
Olympic sailors of the United Team of Germany
Sailors at the 1960 Summer Olympics – Flying Dutchman
Sportspeople from Berlin